The Hazelwood Branch of the Carnegie Library of Pittsburgh located at 4748 Monongahela Street in the Hazelwood neighborhood of Pittsburgh, Pennsylvania, was built in 1899.  It was added to the List of City of Pittsburgh historic designations on July 28, 2004.

The Hazelwood Branch Carnegie Library left this location in mid 2004 and was reopened in a recently constructed building on Second Avenue. In 2009 and again in 2011, the branch was threatened with closure due to funding shortfalls within the Carnegie Library system.

The Branch re-opened in a third location in a renovated church on Second Avenue in June 2014 after a $2.4 million restoration doubling its original 3,500 square feet space to 7,000 square feet. The Monongahela Street structure remains vacant.

References

City of Pittsburgh historic designations
Library buildings completed in 1899
Libraries in Pittsburgh
Carnegie libraries in Pennsylvania
1899 establishments in Pennsylvania